Kammathep Jum Laeng (lit. 'disguised cupid') is a Thai lakorn, the seventh drama in the series The Cupids, based on a novel series of the same name. The novel is written by Praenut and the director is Saranyu Jiralaksanakul. It was aired every Friday–Sunday from June 18, until July 2, 2017.

Synopsis
Prima (Kannarun Wongkajornklai), receives an order from Peem (Theeradej Wongpuapan), her boss to find Kevin Blake (Teeradetch Metawarayut), the CEO of Soulmate.com,  a matchmaking company in America and many European countries. There are rumors in the matchmaking industry that Kevin is planning to expand his company in Asia. So Peem wants to sign a business deal with Kevin Blake because Peem wants to expand his company outside of Asia.

Cast

Main
Kannarun Wongkajornklai as Prima
Teeradetch Metawarayut as Kawin / Kevin Blake

Supporting
Nirut Sirijanya as Cupid

 as Cook Chin

Penpak Sirikul as Kevin's aunt
 as Greg Blake
Chanokwanun Rakcheep as Praemai

Guest
Theeradej Wongpuapan as Peem
Araya A. Hargate as Waralee
Jarinporn Joonkiat as Hunsa
Pakorn Chatborirak as Tim Pitchayatorn
Cris Horwang as Horm Meun Lee
 as Angie
Mintita Wattanakul as Cindy
 as Torn Pitchayatorn

 as Waralee's mom
Oak Keerati

Original Soundtrack

References

External links 
 Ch3 Thailand Official Website
 Ch3 Thailand Official YouTube

2010s Thai television series
Thai drama television series
2017 Thai television series debuts
2017 Thai television series endings
Thai romance television series
Thai television soap operas
Channel 3 (Thailand) original programming
Television series by Broadcast Thai Television